Karaağaç is a village in the İscehisar District, Afyonkarahisar Province, Turkey. Its population is 2,337 (2021).

References

Villages in İscehisar District